Ingleside is an unincorporated community in Lake County, Illinois, United States. Ingleside is between Fox Lake, Round Lake Heights, and Lake Villa.

Geography

Ingleside is on Squaw Creek between Long Lake, Duck Lake, and Fox Lake.

Ingleside lies below the Long Lake Dam and above Fox Lake. Duck Lake and most of the Long Lake area are part of Ingleside. Ingleside also goes northeast to Lake Villa.
 
Notable locations include the Old Grant Township Hall (home of the Grant Township Museum), the Long Lake Dam, the Fox Lake bike trail, Dry Dock Laundromat, and Dog n Suds, a 1950s-style drive-up complete with intercoms for ordering and carhops to bring customers their food. They have a weekly classic car night and are open Tuesday–Sunday seasonally.

The primary elementary school districts are Gavin School District 37 and Big Hollow School District 38.

In the 1960s, mammoth bones were found in Ingleside. They are on display at the Lakes Region Historical Society Museum in Antioch.

In 2008, the Long Lake Dam was rebuilt and modernized. The dam was built in 1930 and reinforced in 1968 and 2008. The Long Lake Dam allows the control of water flowing from Long Lake to Fox Lake and allows pleasure boat traffic from Long Lake to the rest of the Chain O'Lakes.

Transportation

Ingleside is served by Metra commuter train's Milwaukee District / North Line connecting to downtown Chicago.

Demographics
As of the 2000 United States Census, there were 9,286 people living in the village. There were 3,660 housing units. The racial makeup of the village was 75.1% White, 12.3% African American, 0.9% Native American, 3.6% Asian, 0.1% Pacific Islander, 5.5% from other races, and 2.4% from two or more races. Hispanic or Latino of any race were 4.2% of the population.

Notable people

Daniel Dennis, Olympic wrestler (2016)
William J. Stratton (1886–1938), Illinois Secretary of State
William Stratton (1914–2001), 32nd governor of Illinois (1953-1961)

External links
NACo

References 

Unincorporated communities in Illinois
Unincorporated communities in Lake County, Illinois